The 2000 Big Ten men's basketball tournament was the postseason men's basketball tournament for the Big Ten Conference and was played from March 9 to March 12, 2000, at the United Center in Chicago, Illinois. The championship was won by Michigan State who defeated Illinois for the second consecutive year in the championship game. As a result, Michigan State received the Big Ten's automatic bid to the NCAA tournament.

Seeds

All Big Ten schools played in the tournament. Teams were seeded by conference record, with a tiebreaker system used to seed teams with identical conference records. Seeding for the tournament was determined at the close of the regular conference season. The top five teams received a first round bye.

Bracket

Source

All-Tournament team 
 Morris Peterson, Michigan State – Big Ten tournament Most Outstanding Player
 Brian Cook, Illinois
 Mateen Cleaves, Michigan State
 Joe Crispin, Penn State
 Jarrett Stephens, Penn State

Media

Television

Local Radio

References

Big Ten men's basketball tournament
Tournament
Big Ten men's basketball tournament
Big Ten men's basketball tournament